Hannah Duston Memorial State Historic Site is a  statue in Boscawen, New Hampshire, located on a small island at the confluence of the Contoocook and Merrimack rivers. Erected in 1874 and the first publicly funded statue in New Hampshire, the memorial commemorates Hannah Duston, who was captured in 1697 in Haverhill, Massachusetts, during King William's War, then killed her captors while they were camped at the site in Boscawen.

References

External links
Hannah Duston Memorial State Historic Site New Hampshire Department of Natural and Cultural Resources 

State parks of New Hampshire
Parks in Merrimack County, New Hampshire
Boscawen, New Hampshire